Wellington was an electoral district of the Legislative Assembly in the Australian state of New South Wales, created in 1859 and named after and including Wellington. It replaced part of Wellington (County). It was abolished in 1904 due to the re-distribution of electorates following the 1903 New South Wales referendum, which required the number of members of the Legislative Assembly to be reduced from 125 to 90. The district was largely replaced by an expanded The Macquarie, while parts also went to Liverpool Plains and Mudgee.

Members for Wellington

Election results

References

Former electoral districts of New South Wales
Constituencies established in 1859
1859 establishments in Australia
Constituencies disestablished in 1904
1904 disestablishments in Australia